Stjepan Deverić (born 20 August 1961) is a Yugoslav and later Croatian retired professional footballer and former football manager.

Club career
Deverić began his career with Dinamo Zagreb in the Yugoslav First League in 1979. He stayed at the club until 1984, playing in 345 games and scoring 158 goals before moving to Croatian rival Hajduk Split where he stayed from 1984 until 1987 playing in 114 games and scoring 42 goals. He later returned to Dinamo (1987–90). After Croatian independence, he played abroad in Austria with Sturm Graz (1991–92) and Lebring (1993–94).

International career
Internationally, Deverić was part of Yugoslavia's 1982 FIFA World Cup, but did not play. He was also a member of the squad which won bronze at the 1984 Olympics, as well as the Yugoslavian squad at the 1984 UEFA European Football Championship. For Yugoslavia he played in 6 games. Deverić scored 5 goals at the 1984 Summer Olympics and was a joint Top Scorer with Boro Cvetković.

Managerial career
Deverić has also managed. He formerly managed Zagorec Krapina, Segesta, Marsonia, Zrinjski Mostar, Belasitsa Petrich and was a youth coach in Hitrec - Kacian (Dinamo Zagreb youth football school). He also worked as an assistant to manager Igor Pamić at OFK Titograd and took charge at lower league side Lomnica in March 2021.

Honours

Player
Dinamo Zagreb
Yugoslav First League: 1981–82
Yugoslav Cup: 1979–80, 1982–83

Hajduk Split
Yugoslav Cup: 1986–87

Yugoslavia
Summer Olympics third place: 1984

References

External links
 

Serbian national football team website 
Deveric to coach Bulgaria's Belasitsa

1961 births
Living people
Sportspeople from Velika Gorica
Association football forwards
Yugoslav footballers
Yugoslavia international footballers
1982 FIFA World Cup players
UEFA Euro 1984 players
Olympic medalists in football
Medalists at the 1984 Summer Olympics
Olympic footballers of Yugoslavia
Olympic bronze medalists for Yugoslavia
Footballers at the 1984 Summer Olympics
Croatian footballers
GNK Dinamo Zagreb players
HNK Hajduk Split players
SK Sturm Graz players
Yugoslav First League players
Austrian Football Bundesliga players
Croatian expatriate footballers
Expatriate footballers in Austria
Croatian expatriate sportspeople in Austria
Croatian football managers
HNK Segesta managers
NK Marsonia managers
HŠK Zrinjski managers
OFC Belasitsa Petrich managers
Premier League of Bosnia and Herzegovina managers
Croatian expatriate football managers
Expatriate football managers in Bosnia and Herzegovina
Croatian expatriate sportspeople in Bosnia and Herzegovina
Expatriate football managers in Bulgaria
Croatian expatriate sportspeople in Bulgaria
Croatian expatriate sportspeople in Montenegro